Nortrup is a municipality in the district of Osnabrück, in Lower Saxony, Germany.

Mayor
Leonhard Renze was elected in April 1993. He was the successor of Reinhold Gieseke.
Renze was in office till 2016. Since 2016 Karl-Heinz Budke is the new mayor.

Notable people 
 Hermann Kemper (1892-1977), German engineer and pioneer in magnetic levitation.
 Ernst von Hammerstein-Loxten (1827-1914), prussian agrarian minister
 Ludwig von Hammerstein-Loxten (1839-1927), prussian general
 Rudolf von Hammerstein (1735-1811), hannoveranian generalleutnant

References

Osnabrück (district)